Manjinder Kaur (born 17 July 1975) is a member of the India women's national field hockey team. She played with the team when it won the gold medal at the Manchester 2002 Commonwealth Games.

References 
Biography
Commonwealth Games Biography

1975 births
Living people
Indian female field hockey players
Field hockey players at the 2002 Commonwealth Games
Commonwealth Games gold medallists for India
Punjabi people
Field hockey players at the 1994 Asian Games
Field hockey players at the 1998 Asian Games
Field hockey players at the 2002 Asian Games
Medalists at the 1998 Asian Games
Asian Games medalists in field hockey
Asian Games silver medalists for India
Commonwealth Games medallists in field hockey
21st-century Indian women
21st-century Indian people
Medallists at the 2002 Commonwealth Games